The 1976 NCAA Division I Men's Cross Country Championships were the 38th annual cross country meet to determine the team and individual national champions of NCAA Division I men's collegiate cross country running in the United States. Held on November 22, 1976, the meet was hosted by North Texas State University at the NTSU Cross Country Course in Denton, Texas. The distance for this race was 10 kilometers (6.21 miles).

All Division I members were eligible to qualify for the meet. In total, 34 teams and 298 individual runners contested this championship.

The team national championship was retained by the UTEP Miners, their third title. The individual championship was won by Henry Rono, from Washington State, with a meet distance record time of 28:06.60. As of the 2016 championships, Rono's record time has yet to be surpassed during a national NCAA meet despite being recorded during the first ever NCAA championship at the 10 kilometer distance.

Men's title
Distance: 10,000 meters (6.21 miles)

Team Result (Top 10)

Individual Result (Top 10)

See also
NCAA Men's Division II Cross Country Championship 
NCAA Men's Division III Cross Country Championship

References
 

NCAA Cross Country Championships
NCAA Division I Cross Country Championships
NCAA Division I Cross Country Championships
NCAA Division I Cross Country Championships
Sports in Denton, Texas
Track and field in Texas
University of North Texas
Events in Denton, Texas
Sports competitions in Texas